Lance Larsen (born 1961 in Pocatello, Idaho) is an American poet. He served as poet laureate of Utah from 2012 to 2017. In 2007 he received the Literature Fellowship in Poetry from the National Endowment for the Arts. He has been published widely in many of the top poetry journals in the country, including Poetry, The New Republic, Paris Review, Kenyon Review, Southern Review, Orion, JuxtaProse and the 2005 Pushcart Prize Anthology. His writing has been described as embodying a "quaintly romantic notion that mortality and love and soul are the abiding themes of life and art."

Collections
 Erasable Walls (1998)
 In All Their Animal Brilliance (2005)
 Backyard Alchemy (2009)
 Genius Loci (2013)
 What the Body Knows (2018)

See also
 Fire in the Pasture
 Harvest: Contemporary Mormon Poems

References

1961 births
American male poets
Brigham Young University faculty
Latter Day Saint poets
Latter Day Saints from Utah
Poets from Utah
Poets Laureate of Utah
University of Houston alumni
Living people